Change Your World may refer to:

 Change Your World (Darlene Zschech album)
 Change Your World (Michael W. Smith album), 1992